Nathalie Leclerc (born 31 January 1980) is a French female canoeist who won nine medals at individual senior level at the Wildwater Canoeing World Championships and European Wildwater Championships.

References

External links
 Nathalie Leclerc at AIFCK

1980 births
Living people
French female canoeists
Place of birth missing (living people)